Hubert Bächli (born 18 October 1938) is a Swiss former cyclist. He competed in the individual road race and team time trial events at the 1960 Summer Olympics.

References

External links
 

1938 births
Living people
People from Baden District, Aargau
Swiss male cyclists
Olympic cyclists of Switzerland
Cyclists at the 1960 Summer Olympics
Sportspeople from Aargau